The Polarsun Century is a light commercial van produced by the Chinese automobile manufacturer Polarsun Automobile.

History
On February 11, 2007, 500 Polarsun Century vans were exported to South Africa.

Design

The Polarsun Century was based on the fourth generation Toyota HiAce with a completely restyled front fascia and a slightly redesigned rear while the rest of the vehicle was built based on a licensed Toyota HiAce production with interchangeable parts within the shared platforms. It was produced from 2005 to 2009 with prices ranging from 49,980 to 89,800 yuan.

References

External links 

Cars of China
Minibuses
Cab over vehicles
Vans
Vehicles introduced in 2005
Rear-wheel-drive vehicles
All-wheel-drive vehicles